The flag of Goiás was created by Joaquim Bonifácio de Siqueira and it symbolizes the state of Goiás. It has a rectangle shape, with four green odd stripes and four even yellow stripes. On the upper left hoist, a blue rectangle with five white stars (representing the Southern Cross, constellation that gave Brazil its primitive names - Vera Cruz and Santa Cruz), four on each side and one smaller in the center.

The flag was adopted on the president João Alves de Castro's government, by the same law no. 650 of July 30, 1919 and it was organized by Joaquim Bonifácio de Siqueira. As in the national flag (unofficially), the green represents the forests and the yellow represents the gold.

References 

Goiás
Flags introduced in 1919
1919 establishments in Brazil
Goiás